Kõduküla is a village in Elva Parish, Tartu County in southern Estonia. It has a population of 113 (as of 2006).

References

Villages in Tartu County